is the third live video album by Japanese band Wagakki Band, released on January 25, 2017 by Avex Trax in four editions: DVD, Blu-ray, and both editions with additional documentary. In addition, a mu-mo Shop exclusive release includes both documentary editions. The video covers the band's concert at the House of Blues San Diego on July 14, 2016 as part of their first U.S. tour.

The video peaked at No. 10 on Oricon's DVD chart and No. 41 on Oricon's Blu-ray chart.

Track listing
All tracks are arranged by Wagakki Band.

CD version 

The audio CD version of this concert was released on February 6, 2017. It peaked at No. 48 on Oricon's albums chart.

Track listing
All tracks are arranged by Wagakki Band.

Personnel 
 Yuko Suzuhana – vocals
 Machiya – guitar
 Beni Ninagawa – tsugaru shamisen
 Kiyoshi Ibukuro – koto
 Asa – bass
 Daisuke Kaminaga – shakuhachi
 Wasabi – drums
 Kurona – wadaiko

Charts

References

External links 
 
  (Avex Group - DVD/Blu-ray)
  (Avex Group - CD)
 
 

Wagakki Band video albums
2017 live albums
Japanese-language live albums
Avex Group live albums
Avex Group video albums